is a former professional Japanese baseball player.

External links

 NPB.com

1981 births
Living people
People from Shimonoseki
Japanese baseball players
Nippon Professional Baseball infielders
Orix BlueWave players
Orix Buffaloes players
Yokohama BayStars players
Yokohama DeNA BayStars players
Japanese baseball coaches
Nippon Professional Baseball coaches